Decline and Fall... of a Birdwatcher is a 1968 British comedy film directed by John Krish and starring Robin Phillips, Geneviève Page and Donald Wolfit. It is an adaptation of the 1928 novel Decline and Fall by Evelyn Waugh.

The film was made with a budget of $1,970,000.

Plot summary

Paul Pennyfeather is an Oxford divinity student who finds himself sent down after a group of drunken undergraduates remove his trousers and he is accused of exposing himself. Forced to look for work, he seeks the services of an employment agency who secure for him a position at a sleazy Welsh boys' boarding school, presided over by the colourful Dr. Fagan. The school's staff are an assortment of eccentric characters: Mr Prendergast, a withdrawn former clergyman; Captain Grimes, a one-legged philanderer with his eye on Fagan's daughter; and Solomon Philbrick, an undercover criminal posing as Fagan's butler.

Cast
 Robin Phillips as Paul Pennyfeather
 Donald Wolfit as Doctor Augustus Fagan
 Geneviève Page as Margot Beste-Chetwynde
 Colin Blakely as Solomon Philbrick
 Felix Aylmer as Judge
 Robert Harris as Prendergast
 Leo McKern as Captain Grimes
 Patrick Magee as Maniac
 Donald Sinden as Prison Governor
 Griffith Jones as Sir Humphrey Maltravers
 Paul Rogers as Chief Warder
 Rodney Bewes as Arthur Potts
 Patience Collier as Flossie Fagan
 Kenneth Griffith as Mr Church
 Joan Sterndale-Bennett as Lady Circumference

Box office
According to Fox records the film required $3,100,000 in rentals to break even and by 11 December 1970 had made $1,475,000 so made a loss to the studio.

References

External links
 
 
 
 

1968 films
British musical comedy films
1960s musical comedy films
Films directed by John Krish
Films based on British novels
Films based on works by Evelyn Waugh
Films scored by Ron Goodwin
1969 comedy films
1969 films
1968 comedy films
1960s English-language films
1960s British films